The 2023 Supercars Championship (known for commercial reasons as the 2023 Repco Supercars Championship) is an ongoing motor racing series for Supercars. It is the twenty-fifth running of the Supercars Championship and the twenty-seventh series in which Supercars have contested the Australian Touring Car Championship, the premier title in Australian motorsport.

The 2023 season saw the introduction of Gen3, a revision to the sport's technical regulations. These regulations were designed to cut costs for competitors by introducing more standardised components to the cars and redesigning the chassis to favour coupé body shapes.

Shane van Gisbergen and Triple Eight Race Engineering entered the season as defending Drivers' and Teams' Champions respectively.

Teams and drivers 

The following teams and drivers are competing in the 2023 championship.

Manufacturer changes 
Chevrolet returned to the series for the first time since 1984. All Holden-backed teams are running the Camaro model, after General Motors retired the Holden brand.

All Ford teams upgraded to the Mustang GT S650.

Team changes 
Walkinshaw Andretti United switched from Holden to Ford. In addition, Walkinshaw Andretti United is receiving the same treatment as Dick Johnson Racing, Tickford Racing, Blanchard Racing Team and Grove Racing by earning a full-factory support from Ford Performance.

Driver changes 
Cameron Hill graduated from the Super2 Series to race full time at Matt Stone Racing. He replaced Todd Hazelwood, who left the team and join Blanchard Racing Team, replacing Tim Slade, who joined PremiAir Racing replacing Chris Pither.

Declan Fraser graduated from the Super2 Series to replace Jake Kostecki after Tickford Racing terminated his contract early. Kostecki was intended to race with the team throughout 2023.

Matthew Payne graduated from the Super2 Series to race full time at Grove Racing. He replaced Lee Holdsworth, who announced his retirement from full-time competition at the end of the 2022 season.

Calendar 
Twelve, down from thirteen in 2022, circuits are due to host a round of the 2023 championship.

Calendar changes 
The Newcastle 500 returned as the season opener, after a three year absence due to the COVID-19 pandemic.

Pukekohe Park Raceway will close, citing the focus on horse racing and club facilities: a new venue in New Zealand was unable to be secured for 2023.

The Sandown 500 will return to the calendar for the first time 2019, and the first as the precursor to the Bathurst 1000 since 2018.

The Perth SuperNight reverted to a SuperSprint format and the Winton SuperSprint was omitted from the calendar.

Rule changes

Gen3 

Gen3 made its debut, replacing the Car of the Future regulations that débuted in 2013, with regulations designed to lower costs of a standard Supercar. It was due to début midway through 2022, but due to ongoing challenges with international supply chains and domestic disruptions caused by the COVID-19 pandemic, it was delayed to 2023.

The regulations introduced more controlled components into the cars to address the rising costs of maintaining a car. The pedal kit, brake kit and wheels became control components, with tenders needing the rims to be 'finger friendly' for pit crew during a pit stop. The roll cage lowered by 100mm to be suited to coupes, after the controversy surrounding the Ford Mustang GT, which required the roof to be stretched beyond the dimensions of its road-going counterpart to fit the Car of the Future chassis. Supercars manufacturered the roll cage in kit form for teams that do not have the budget to build one themselves.

The engines on Gen3 overhauled, with pushrod engines replaced with fuel-injected, V8 engines, with the Camaro running a 5.7 Litre LTR V8, while the Mustang will run a 5.4 Litre Coyote V8. This is intended to modernise the engine and significantly reduce costs of building and maintaining them.

Aerodynamic downforce cut by 67% to encourage closer racing and easier overtaking after complaints from drivers about dirty air and aerowash from current Gen2 cars.

Minimum weight decreased from 1,400 kg to 1,335 kg, with a 95 kg minimum of driver and seat weight combination.

Triple Eight Race Engineering oversaw the development of the Chevrolet Camaro ZL1 as a replacement for the Holden ZB Commodore. The Camaro ZL1 was chosen after parent company General Motors decided to discontinue the Holden brand and shut down production of the Commodore. Dick Johnson Racing also oversaw the development of the S650 Mustang.

Other changes 
A new E75 fuel blend introduced, down from E85 that was used from 2009, which utilizes more renewable bio fuels to lower carbon emissions.

Results

Season summary

Points

Points system
Points were awarded for each race at an event, to the driver or drivers of a car that completed at least 75% of the race distance and was running at the completion of the race. At least 50% of the planned race distance must be completed for the result to be valid and championship points awarded. No extra points were awarded if the fastest lap time is achieved by a driver who was classified outside the top fifteen.

Endurance: Used for the Sandown 500 and Bathurst 1000.
Two-race: Used for the Newcastle 500, Townsville 500, Sydney SuperNight, Gold Coast 500 and Adelaide 500.
SuperSprint: Used for all SuperSprint races and the Darwin Triple Crown.
Melbourne: Used for the Melbourne 400.

Drivers' Championship

Teams' Championship

Notes

References

External links

Supercars
Supercars Championship seasons
Supercars